Mehdi Tolouti is an Iranian boxer. At the 2012 Summer Olympics, he competed in the Men's light welterweight, but was defeated in the second round.

References

Year of birth missing (living people)
Living people
Olympic boxers of Iran
Boxers at the 2012 Summer Olympics
Welterweight boxers
Iranian male boxers